Back For Another Taste is the seventh Helix studio album and eighth album altogether.  It was also their last album of their original Capitol Records contract.  In a fall 1987 interview on MuchMusic with Erica Ehm, lead vocalist Brian Vollmer jokingly stated that this album would be titled Blood, Sweat & Beer. One of the album's singles, "Running Wild in the 21st Century", reached #1 on the RPM Cancon chart.

Track listing 
 "The Storm"
 "Running Wild in the 21st Century"
 "That's Life"
 "Breakdown"
 "Heavy Metal Cowboys"
 "Back for Another Taste"
 "Rockin' Rollercoaster"
 "Midnight Express"
 "Good to the Last Drop"
 "Give It to You"
 "Wheels of Thunder"

 The UK edition of Back for Another Taste contains a bonus track, "Wild in the Streets" from the Wild in the Streets (1987) album. This bonus track appeared at the end of Side 1, or between "Heavy Metal Cowboys" and "Back for Another Taste" as the 6th track on the CD.

Credits

Helix 
Brian Vollmer – lead vocals
Paul Hackman – guitars, backing vocals
Daryl Gray – bass, backing vocals
Greg "Fritz" Hinz – drums (1-6, 10, 11), backing vocals

Additional Musicians 
The Doctor (Brent Doerner) – lead (6, 11) and rhythm guitar, backing vocals
Marc Ribler – lead, rhythm and acoustic guitars, backing vocals (8, 9)
Brian Doerner – drums (7-9)
John Adamo – piano (11) and programming
Sal Andolina – saxophone (2)
Gord Prior – backing vocals (8)

Production 
Produced by Tony Bongiovi and Helix 
Recorded at The River Studios - Fort Erie, Ontario, Canada
Alex Haas, Dave O'Donnell, Gary Solomon, Michael Christopher, Rob Eaton, Steve Boyer, Steve Rinkoff, Tony Bongiovi - mixing at Power Station, New York City

Singles 
"The Storm"
"Running Wild in the 21st Century"  (awarded "Heavy Metal Video of the Year" in 1990 on MuchMusic) 

"Good To The Last Drop"  (Cassette single release only:  B-side track "S.E.X. Rated" remains unreleased on CD to date in this version, as it is a different recording than that on the Helix B-Sides CD.)

Charts

Album

Singles

References 

Helix (band) albums
1990 albums
Capitol Records albums